The Police Act 1893 (56 & 57 Vict., c. 10) was an Act of the Parliament of the United Kingdom. It clarified the Police Act 1890 by stating that time spent by an officer acting as a fireman or extinguishing a fire was to be accounted as time spent "in the execution of his duty" and enabled watch committees to use police officers full- or part-time as firemen, with their pay, pensions and gratuities funded from the usual police, "fire police" or "fire brigade" sources. It also enabled police authorities to increase an ex-officer's injury pension in the first three years after it was first granted if a medical assessment proved the ex-officer's level of disability had increased from partial to total.

References

United Kingdom Acts of Parliament 1893
Police legislation in the United Kingdom
Pensions in the United Kingdom
Fire and rescue in England
Fire and rescue in Wales